The Devil Makes Sunday is a 1962 Australian television play by New Zealand -born author Bruce Stewart. It was broadcast live from Melbourne, and taped and shown in other cities at a later date.

It was one of the most violent plays on early Australian television.

The play had previously been performed on British and US television. Australian TV drama was relatively rare at the time. Filmink magazine wrote "this, along with Light Me a Lucifer, is the old Australian TV play more than any other we wish we could see because it sounds very exciting."

Premise
In 1840, the convict settlement on Norfolk Island is run by Major Childs, who likes to punish convicts before church service on Sunday. A convict called Clay breaks out of prison and holds up the prison governor and his household in their dining room. Clay demands a boat for his escape.

Cast

 Syd Conabere as Clay
 Mark Kelly as Jack
 Robert Peach as Major Childs, the prison governor
 Carole Potter as Dora Childs
David Mitchell

Production

Syd Conabere, who plays Clay, had previous performed in that role in an adaptation of the play for ABC Radio in 1961.

Producer William Sterling said Stewart wrote a "marvelous emotional study in his play."

The production was shot in Melbourne.

Reception

The TV critic from the Sydney Morning Herald thought the production was "chiefly remarkable for the briskness of its violence" listing the "five deaths by shooting, one by strangulation and one by public flogging. Even a hardworking Elizabethan playwright of the most bloodthirsty kind would have thought this a respectable tally."

He added "Stewart's principal characters were merely mouthpieces for a set of ethical attitudes. Because they were so obviously pieces on a moralistic chessboard and because their dialogue dealt in words like good and evil without once making these seem more than black and white abstractions, their predicament was almost totally unmoving."

He also felt producer (director) William Sterling "was busy enough with his properties and cameras...but he seemed actually to have encouraged the actors playing the prison commandant and the chaplain to emphasise the intrinsic hollowness of their dialogue." However the performance of Sydney Conabere was praised.

References

External links

Australian drama films
1960s Australian television plays
1962 television plays
1962 films
1962 drama films
Films set in 1840
Films set in colonial Australia
Films directed by William Sterling (director)
1960s English-language films